Marathon swimming is a class of open water swimming defined by long distances (at least ) and traditional rules based in English Channel swimming. Unlike marathon foot-races which have a specifically defined distance, marathon swims vary in distance.

As in all open water swimming, tides, surface currents and wind-chop are major determinants of finish-times. For a given course, these factors can vary dramatically from day to day, making any attempt to draw conclusions about athletic ability by comparing finish times from performances undertaken on different days meaningless.

One of the earliest marathon swims was accomplished in 1875 by Captain Matthew Webb, when he became the first person to swim across the English Channel.  Similarly, perhaps the most famous marathon swim of all time was accomplished in 1926 by Gertrude Ederle, when she became, at 19 years of age, the first woman to swim across the English Channel.  In doing so, she demolished the existing world record for the crossing, by employing the crawl stroke technique.

 
The Ocean's seven is a collection of seven channel swims: (1) North Channel between Ireland and Scotland, (2) Cook Strait between the North and South Islands of New Zealand, (3) Molokai Channel between Oahu and Molokai Islands in Hawaii, (4) English Channel between England and France, (5) Catalina Channel between Santa Catalina Island and Southern California, (6) Tsugaru Strait between the islands of Honshu and Hokkaido in Japan, and (7) Strait of Gibraltar between Europe and Africa. Irish swimmer Steve Redmond became the first person to complete the Ocean's seven upon completing the Tsugaru Strait on May 15, 2012.

Solo swims
 English Channel
 Catalina Channel (Santa Catalina – mainland)
 North Channel (Great Britain and Ireland) (formerly known as the Irish Channel) 
 Tsugaru Strait
 Strait of Gibraltar
 Strait of Bonifacio
 Rottnest Channel Swim  (Australia)
 Cook Strait
 Swim Miami
 Beltquerung
 Otranto Strait
 Backstairs Passage

Group swims
 Rottnest Channel Swim  (Australia)
 FINA World Aquatics Championships 
 FINA World Open Water Swimming Championships

See also
 English Channel swimmers
 Ocean's seven
 King of the Channel
 Queen of the Channel

References

External links
 Channel Swimming Association
 Channel Swimming & Piloting Federation
 Catalina Channel Swimming Federation
 NYC Swim
 ACNEG (Strait of Gibraltar Swimming Association)
 NAL (Strait of Bonifacio Swimming Association)
 Marathon Swimmers Federation
 Triple Crown of Open Water Swimming
 FINA 10km Marathon Swimming World Cup
 FINA Open Water Swimming Grand Prix
 Open water swimming in Greece

Swimming
Open water swimming